Grebe Lake is a  backcountry lake in Yellowstone National Park most noted for its population of Arctic grayling. Grebe Lake comprises the headwaters of the Gibbon River. The trail to the lake passes through mostly level Lodgepole Pine forest and open meadows. The lake was named by J.P. Iddings, a geologist with the Arnold Hague geologic surveys. There are four backcountry campsites located on the lake.

Arctic grayling

In 1921, U.S. Fish Commission personnel stocked Grebe Lake, at that time fishless, with the Montana strain Thymallus arcticus montanus of a lacustrine form  of Arctic Grayling. The original stocks came from Georgetown Lake near Anaconda, Montana. The fluvial form of Arctic Grayling was native to the Madison and Gibbon Rivers below Gibbon Falls. In an effort to re-establish grayling in western states, over 72 million grayling eggs were harvested from Grebe Lake between 1931 and 1956 and distributed to hatcheries. Most lake dwelling grayling in the west today can be genetically traced to the Grebe Lake stocks. Grebe Lake was closed to fishing until 1944 because of the fish culture operations at the lake.

Angling

Grebe Lake used to hold both lacustrine arctic grayling and rainbow trout. In 2017, the NPS embarked on a three-year fish restoration project in the upper Gibbon river watershed to remove all non-native trout and grayling.  Grebe lake and its tributaries were poisoned with rotenone in the summer of 2017 to remove the grayling and rainbow trout.  Westslope cutthroat trout and fluvial arctic grayling were planted in the lake. Both are native to the Gibbon watershed below Gibbon Falls but not indigenous to the upper Gibbon watershed.  The NPS hopes to establish a refuge for these species in the upper Gibbon watershed.

The lake is a popular summer angling destination for park visitors. Although the lake can be fished from shore, many anglers carry in float tubes to access the deeper portions of the lake. Using a float tube on Yellowstone lakes requires a park service boating permit. The lake is open to angling during the entire Yellowstone season (end of May to early November) but generally cannot be easily accessed until mid June because of snow on the trail.

See also
 Angling in Yellowstone National Park
 Fishes of Yellowstone National Park

Notes

Lakes of Wyoming
Bodies of water of Park County, Wyoming
Lakes of Yellowstone National Park